The Sheila Joan Smith Professorship of Tumour Immunology at the University of Cambridge was originally established on 2 November 1977 for the tenure only of Peter Lachmann. It was renamed as the Sheila Joan Smith Professorship of Immunology in 1988 and was re-established on the retirement of Professor Lachmann.

List of Sheila Joan Smith Professors of Tumour Immunology
1977-1988 Peter Julius Lachmann

List of Sheila Joan Smith Professors of Immunology
1988 - 1999 Peter Julius Lachmann
2000 - Douglas Fearon

References

Immunology, Smith, Sheila Joan
School of Clinical Medicine, University of Cambridge
Immunology, Smith, Sheila Joan
1977 establishments in England